The Movie Man is the debut album by Guelo Star. It was released digitally on November 6, 2012.

Track listing

2012 albums
Reggaeton albums